Al-Sadek Hamed Al-Shuwehdy (or Sadiq Hamed Shwehdi) (c. 1954 – executed 1984) was a Libyan student and aeronautical engineer who was executed following a show trial in the basketball stadium in Benghazi, Libya. The trial was broadcast live on Libyan state television.Al-Shuwehdy had returned from America three months earlier where he had been studying, and had begun to protest Gaddafi's regime. 

While working as an engineer at an airport he joined friends that were campaigning against Gaddafi. Libyan police later seized him at his home; he was executed a few months later. Al-Shuwehdy's family never received his body; mourners later arriving at their house would be physically intimidated. After his death, members of his family also experienced difficulty finding employment or securing places at a university.

Trial
The trial and execution was witnessed in the stadium by thousands of youth, particularly high school and  University students, who had been specifically bussed in for the occasion.  Al-Shuwehdy was alone in the centre of the stadium, with his hands bound behind his back, and wept as he confessed to his crime of joining the "stray dogs", regime terminology for dissidents, before being sentenced to death. 

He was accused of plotting to assassinate Gaddafi. The court described him as "a terrorist from the Muslim Brotherhood, an agent of America". Two young men ran up to the judges and begged them for mercy, and a gallows was produced in the middle of the basketball court.

Execution
As Al-Shuwehdy kicked and writhed on the gallows, Huda Ben Amer, then a young Gaddafi loyalist, stepped forward, and grabbed his legs, pulling hard on his body until the struggling stopped. Her actions brought her to the attention of Gaddafi, and she was given a government position and rapidly promoted in the ranks.  She later twice became the mayor of Benghazi and one of Libya's richest and most powerful women. Her intervention during Al-Shuwehdy's execution earned her the nickname "Huda the executioner". Amer was captured in Tripoli by National Transitional Council forces during the Libyan civil war in September 2011.

The previous month Gaddafi's Bab al-Aziziya compound in Tripoli had been raided in an attempted coup planned by the National Front for the Salvation of Libya. Al-Shuwehdy's cousin Magdi was killed in the raid. In the aftermath, 2,000 people were arrested and twelve were publicly hanged in their home towns. Other hangings were later broadcast, and re-broadcast, on Libyan state television.

Live broadcast
The execution was broadcast live on state television. The film of his trial and execution was rediscovered in 2011 during the Libyan Civil War by Peter Bouckaert, a researcher for Human Rights Watch. Bouckaert was assisted by British photographer Tim Hetherington; it was the last project that Hetheringon was working on at the time of his death. The trial was viewed live on television by many Libyans but had not been seen in full since 1984. The footage of the trial was given to Brouckaert by Shwehdi's brother Ibrahim, who gave four Beta video tapes to be digitized and preserved.

References

1984 deaths
Libyan aerospace engineers
Executed Libyan people
Filmed executions
20th-century executions by Libya
People executed by Libya by hanging
Deaths by person in Africa
1984 in Libya